The 1929 New Year Honours in New Zealand were appointments by King George V on the advice of the New Zealand government to various orders and honours to reward and highlight good works by New Zealanders. The awards celebrated the passing of 1928 and the beginning of 1929, but their announcement was delayed until 28 February because of the King's health.

The recipients of honours are displayed here as they were styled before their new honour.

Knight Bachelor
 Carrick Hey Robertson   – of Auckland.

Order of Saint Michael and Saint George

Knight Commander (KCMG)
 The Honourable William Nosworthy – of Ashburton; formerly a member of the Executive Council.

Companion (CMG)
 Hugh Fraser Ayson – of Rarotonga; resident commissioner and chief judge of the High Court and of the Native Land Court, Cook Islands.
 John William MacDonald – of Wellington; public trustee.

Order of the British Empire

Commander (CBE)
Civil division
 John Baird Thompson – of Wellington; under-secretary, Lands and Survey Department.

References

New Year Honours
1929 awards
1929 in New Zealand
New Zealand awards